Coventry Blaze NIHL are a British ice hockey team based in Coventry, England. They are the NIHL affiliate of Coventry Blaze of the EIHL. The team started life as Coventry Blaze (ENL) in 2007, changing their name to Coventry Blaze NIHL ahead of the 2012–13 season. The team often provides many juniors competitive ice time. The team withdrew from the 2019–20 season, after being unable to replace the players that had left during the off-season, returning to NIHL action ahead of the 2020–21 season.

Season-by-season record

Club roster 2020–21

2020/21 Outgoing

References

External links 

 Coventry Blaze NIHL official site

Ice hockey teams in England